Rae Natalie Prosser de Goodall (April 13, 1935, near Lexington, Ohio, United States – May 25, 2015, Estancia Harberton, Tierra del Fuego Province, Argentina,) also known as Natalie Goodall, was a biologist based in Tierra del Fuego Province, Argentina and known for studying the region's flora and fauna.

Biography
Rae Natalie Prosser de Goodall was born Rae Natalie Prosser on a farm near Lexington, Ohio. She was awarded an art scholarship to Kent State University, where she became a member of the Gamma Phi Beta sorority. Prosser graduated with bachelor's degrees in education, biology, and art, as well as a master's degree in biology. She worked as a teacher for Mobil in Venezuela after graduating, during which time she traveled extensively in Venezuela, Colombia, and the Caribbean islands, studying the local plants and wildlife. On a trip to western South America with a fellow teacher, Prosser visited the Tierra del Fuego area, having been inspired by Lucas Bridges' book Uttermost Part of the Earth. While on this trip she met her future husband Thomas Goodall, a great-nephew of the book's author and manager of the Estancia Harberton ranch featured in the book. The two were married in the United States in 1963. Goodall and her husband continued to maintain Estancia Harberton for the remainder of her life, raising two daughters on the ranch and in the nearby city of Ushuaia. Goodall's family has continued to manage Estancia Harberton following her 2015 death. Her husband, children, and grandchildren are the fourth, fifth and sixth-generation descendants, respectively, of Thomas Bridges, the builder of Estancia Harberton and an Anglican missionary credited with spreading Christianity in the Tierra del Fuego region.

In 2001, Goodall curated items from her personal collection to create the Acatushun Museum of Austral Birds and Mammals (Museo Acatushun) on the grounds of Estancia Harberton. She also collaborated with the National Geographic Society and other national and international organizations devoted to nature research, including AMMA (Association of Southern Marine Mammals), the Orca del Fin del Mundo project and CEQUA (Center for Quaternary Studies).  She founded and chaired the RNP Foundation (Rae Natalie Prosser Foundation) for biological research in Southern South America, which endows internships and scholarships for students and professionals in the natural sciences.

Publications
In 1970, Goodall published a book entitled Tierra del Fuego, containing studies of the local flora and fauna, as well as historical information about the settlement of the area. This book continues to be used both as a tourist guide and a reference manual and is considered an ad honorem historical work. Goodall also contributed to various scientific journals throughout her life. Some notable publications include:

 "Interspecific variation of ontogeny and skull shape among porpoises (Phocoenidae)", in Journal of Morphology.
 "On the identity of Tursio Chiloensis Philippi 1900", in Marine Mammal Science.
 "Serrated Flippers and Directional Asymmetry in the Appendicular Skeleton of the Commerson's Dolphin", in The Anatomical Record.

Some of Goodall's drawings of the plants and wildlife of Tierra del Fuego are in the collection of the Hunt Botanical Library, which is part of the Hunt Institute for Botanical Documentation at Carnegie Mellon University in Pittsburgh, Pennsylvania. She was also featured as a botanical artist in the book Botanical Art and Illustration (1972–1973), a publication of the Hunt library.

Memberships
 Museo Argentino de Ciencias Naturales «Bernardino Rivadavia», Ciudad Autónoma de Buenos Aires
 Museum of the End of the World, Ushuaia, Tierra del Fuego, Argentina.
 Museum of New Zealand Te Papa Tongarewa (formerly the National Museum of New Zealand).
 Museo de la Ciudad, Río Grande, Tierra del Fuego.
 Long Marine Laboratory, University of California Santa Cruz
 Centro Austral de Investigaciones Científicas (CADIC), Ushuaia, Tierra del Fuego.
 Independent ad honorem researcher of the National Council of Scientific and Technical Research of Argentina (Conicet)
 Solamac Latin American Society, an organization focused on aquatic mammals.

Acknowledgments
 Albatross Prize, Universidad Nacional de la Patagonia San Juan Bosco, 1983.
 International guest member, The Society of Woman Geographers, 1984.
 Lighthouse of the End of the World, a prize awarded by the government of Tierra del Fuego, 1994.
 International guest member, Explorers Club of New York, 1995.
 Gold Medal, The Society of Woman Geographers, 1996. (Awarded for her studies of the plants and wildlife native to Tierra del Fuego)
 Member of the Ohio Women's Hall of Fame, 1996.
 Recipient of Doctorate Honoris Causa in Sciences, Kent State University, 1997.
 Special Achievement Award, Kent State University Alumnae, 1997.
 Pink Carnation Award, highest award of Gamma Phi Beta, 1998.

References

External links
 Museo Acatushun y Fundación RNP
 Entrevista a Natalie Goodall

1935 births
2015 deaths
Naturalized citizens of Argentina
American biologists
Isla Grande de Tierra del Fuego
Argentine biologists
People from Lexington, Ohio
Members of the Society of Woman Geographers
Scientists from Ohio